The Red River system is a network of rivers surrounding the main river - Red River in North Vietnam. These branches of the system contribute to or receive water from Red River. Red River system, joining with the Thái Bình river system in the northeast, creates the Red River Delta - the second largest delta in Vietnam. Because of the close relation between Red River system and Thái Bình river system, the two system are known as the common name Red and Thai Binh rivers system. Alluvium of the Red River system creates the central and south Red River Delta. Two banks of the rivers are protected by a great dyke system.

Rivers of the system

Main river: Red River
Confluences:
Da River
Lô River
Besides that, confluences of another river - River Đáy, a river starts from mountainous area of Hòa Bình and Ninh Bình provinces, including Bôi river, Hoàng Long river, Vạc river although not contribute water to Red River, but for several reasons, they are still considered as Red River confluences.
Branches:
River Đáy and its branches
Nhuệ River
Đuống River
Phủ Lý River (or Châu Giang River)
Luoc River linking Red River with Thái Bình River
Trà Lý River, flowing eastward through Thái Bình Province
Diêm Hộ River
Ninh Cơ River flowing southward through Nam Định Province
Nam Định River
So River
Lân River

River mouth

Ba Lat, main river mouth, located in the border between Thái Bình provinces and Nam Định provinces
Diêm Hộ, Trà Lý, Lân (Thái Bình Province)
So, Lach Giang (Nam Định Province)
Đáy, located in the border between Ninh Bình and Nam Định provinces.

Geography of Vietnam